Por Amor (1982) is Menudo's tenth Spanish album, featuring Ricky Meléndez, Johnny Lozada, Xavier Serbiá, Miguel Cancel, and new member Charlie Massó. Charlie replaced René Farrait as René reached the age limit.

Track listing
 Quiero Rock (Alejandro Monroy, Julio Seijas, Claudio Villa) [2:36] - Singer: Miguel Cancel
 Lady (Monroy, Seijas, Villa) [3:36] - Singer: Johnny Lozada
 Y Yo No Bailo (Monroy, Seijas, Villa) [2:41] - Singer: Ricky Meléndez
 Es Por Amor (Eddy Guerin, Seijas, Villa) [3:51] - Singer: Miguel Cancel
 Chispa De La Vida (Monroy) [3:06] - Singer: Charlie Massó
 Dulces Besos (Monroy, Seijas, Villa) [3:21] - Singer: Johnny Lozada
 Fórmula (Escolar) 3:19 - Singer: Xavier Serbiá
 Cuándo Pasará (Luis Gómex Escolar, Seijas) [3:48] - Singer: Miguel Cancel
 Como Eres Tú (Monroy, Villa) [3:48] - Singers: the entire group
 Susana (Escolar) [3:30] - Singers: the entire group

References

1982 albums
Menudo (band) albums